Rosamund Lupton (née Orde-Powlett), is a British author. She studied literature at Cambridge University. She is perhaps best known for her novels Sister, Afterwards, The Quality of Silence and Three Hours

Early life and family
Lupton was born 22 July 1964, the daughter of  the Hon. Patrick Christopher Orde-Powlett, son of  Nigel Amyas Orde-Powlett, 6th Baron Bolton of Bolton Castle. On 1 May 1999 she married Martin G.F. Lupton, son of Geoffrey Charles Martineau Lupton (b.1930) who was the grandson of Leeds Lord Mayor Hugh Lupton.

Career
In her first novel Sister, Lupton tells the story of Beatrice, living in New York, in search for Tess, her missing sister, who lives in London.

Sister sold over 1.5 million copies worldwide. It has been translated in 30 languages, and it is a best-seller on the New York Times and Sunday Times lists. It received positive reviews from critics.

Her second novel Afterwards was awarded "best mystery books of 2012" by the Seattle Times, and "best book of 2012" by Amazon.com.

FilmNation optioned the film rights to her third novel, The Quality of Silence, in March 2016. Her new novel 'Three Hours' was published in January 2020 and is a Sunday Times bestseller and the Times thriller of the year

Rosamund Lupton was a winner of Carlton Television's new writers' competition, and before being a novelist, she was a script-writer for television and film, writing original screenplays.

Works

References

External links 
 

1964 births
Living people
English women novelists
21st-century English novelists
21st-century English women
Alumni of the University of Cambridge